Wellington College International Tianjin (天津惠灵顿国际学校) is a British international school in Hongqiao District, Tianjin. It is affiliated with Wellington College in Berkshire, England and serves students 2-18; senior school serves ages 11–18.

The school opened in 2011. Initially it planned to offer, the initial expected student account was 500, and the school planned to have up to 1,200 students. The school was scheduled to open with A levels and offer IB diplomas after receiving permission from the International Baccalaureate Organisation. A school must already be open before receiving permission to offer IB.

Campus
The campus has more than 90 classrooms, 2 swimming pools, art rooms, design rooms,  a dance studio, a 500-seat theatre, and music rooms. There are also artificial sports pitches.

There are boarding facilities for senior school students. Wellington Tianjin was scheduled to initially open as only a day school, and it's now offering boarding to students above year 7.

Demographics
In 2011 Warwick Mansell of The Telegraph stated that it was anticipated that the largest group of students would be of East Asian origin, including Mainland Chinese students with foreign passports, Japanese, and Koreans. People from the United Kingdom were expected to make up 15% of the student body and the school also expected to have significant numbers of other European nationalities.

See also
 Wellington College International Shanghai - Another Wellington College school in China
 Wellington College Bilingual Shanghai - Another Wellington College campus in China

References

External links
 Wellington College International Tianjin
 Wellington College International Tianjin 

British international schools in China
International schools in Tianjin
International Baccalaureate schools in China
2011 establishments in China
Educational institutions established in 2011
Boarding schools in China